Hesar-e Sorkh (also Romanized as Ḩeşār-e Sorkh, Ḩeşār Sorkh, and Hisār Surkh) is a village in Neyzar Rural District, Salafchegan District, Qom County, Qom Province, Iran. At the 2006 census, its population was 161, in 38 families.

References 

Populated places in Qom Province